This article contains a list of the works of Jean-Baptiste Lully (LWV); also lists of the dance-forms and instruments he frequently was to use.

Works by Lully (Lully-Werke-Verzeichnis)

The catalogue was published in 1981 by Herbert Schneider (Chronologisch-Thematisches Verzeichnis sämtlicher Werke von Jean-Baptiste Lully).

{| class="wikitable sortable"
!ID
!Title
|-
|LWV 1
|Le temps
|-
|LWV 2
|Les plaisirs
|-
|LWV 3
|Dialogue de la Guerre avec la Paix
|-
|LWV 4
|Les bienvenus
|-
|LWV 5
|La revente des habits de ballet et de comédie
|-
|LWV 6
|Psyché, ou La puissance de l'amour
|-
|LWV 7
|La galanterie du temps
|-
|LWV 8
|Amour malade
|-
|LWV 9
|Alcidiane
|-
|LWV 10
|Première marche des mousquetaires
|-
|LWV 11
|La raillerie
|-
|LWV 12
|Intermèdes de Xerxes
|-
|LWV 13
|Ballet mascarade
|-
|LWV 14
|L'impatience
|-
|LWV 15
|Les saisons
|-
|LWV 16
|Les facheux
|-
|LWV 17
|L'Hercule amoureux
|-
|LWV 18
|Les arts
|-
|LWV 19
|Les Noces de village
|-
|LWV 20
|Le mariage forcé
|-
|LWV 21
|Les amours déguisés
|-
|LWV 22
|Plaisirs de l'Ile enchantée
|-
|LWV 23
|Entractes d'Œdipe
|-
|LWV 24
|Mascarade du Capitaine
|-
|LWV 25
|Miserere
|-
|LWV 26
|O Lachrymae fideles
|-
|LWV 27
|La naissance de Vénus
|-
|LWV 28
|Les gardes, ou Les délices de la campagne
|-
|LWV 29
|L'Amour médecin
|-
|LWV 30
|Le triomphe de Bacchus dans les Indes
|-
|LWV 31
|Branles
|-
|LWV 32
|Les muses
|-
|LWV 33
|La pastorale comique
|-
|LWV 34
|Le Sicilien, ou L'Amour peintre
|-
|LWV 35
|18 Trios pour le coucher du roi
|-
|LWV 36
|Le carnaval
|-
|LWV 37
|Plaude laetare Gallia
|-
|LWV 38
|George Dandin
|-
|LWV 39
|La grotte de Versailles
|-
|LWV 40
|Flore
|-
|LWV 41
|Monsieur de Pourceaugnac
|-
|LWV 42
|Les amants magnifiques
|-
|LWV 43
|Le bourgeois gentilhomme / Der Bürger als Edelmann
|-
|LWV 44
|Marches et batteries de tambour
|-
|LWV 45
|Psyché
|-
|LWV 46
|Ballet des ballets
|-
|LWV 47
|Le triomphe de l’amour et de Bachus (pastorale, 1672, as described and named in the manuscript)
|-
|LWV 48
|Marche
|-
|LWV 49
|Cadmus et Hermione
|-
|LWV 50
|Alceste, ou Le triomphe d'Alcide
|-
|LWV 51
|Thésée
|-
|LWV 52
|Le carnaval
|-
|LWV 53
|Atys
|-
|LWV 54
|Isis
|-
|LWV 55
|Te Deum
|-
|LWV 56
|Psyché
|-
|LWV 57
|Bellérophon
|-
|LWV 58
|Proserpine
|-
|LWV 59
|Le triomphe de l'amour
|-
|LWV 60
|Persée
|-
|LWV 61
|Phaëton
|-
|LWV 62
|De profundis
|-
|LWV 63
|Amadis
|-
|rowspan="2"|LWV 64
|1. Dies irae
|-
|2. Benedictus
|-
|LWV 65
|Roland
|-
|LWV 66
|Marches pour le régiment de Savoie
|-
|LWV 67
|Quare fremuerunt
|-
|LWV 68
|Idylle sur la paix
|-
|LWV 69
|Le temple de la paix
|-
|LWV 70
|Pièces de symphonie
|-
|LWV 71
|Armide
|-
|LWV 72
|Airs pour le carrousel de Monseigneur
|-
|LWV 73
|Acis et Galatée / Acis und Galatea
|-
|LWV 74
|Achille et Polyxène
|-
|LWV 75
|Marches
|-
|rowspan="26"|LWV 76
|1. Ingrate bergère
|-
|2. Aunque prodigoas
|-
|3. Scoca pur tutti
|-
|4. A la fin petit Desfarges
|-
|5. D'un beau pêcheur la pêche malheureuse
|-
|6. Un tendre coeur
|-
|7. Courage, Amour, la paix est faite
|-
|8. Non vi è più bel piacer
|-
|9. Le printemps, aimable Silvie
|-
|10. Tous les jours cent bergères
|-
|11. Viens, mon aimable bergère
|-
|12. Qui les aura, mes secrètes amours
|-
|13. Où êtes-vous allez, mes belles
|-
|14. Nous meslons toute notre gloire
|-
|15. Pendant que ces flambeaux
|-
|16. La langueur des beaux yeux
|-
|17. On dit que vos yeux sont trompeurs
|-
|18. Que vous connaissez peu trop aimable Climène
|-
|19. Si je n'ay parlé de ma flamme
|-
|20. En ces lieux je ne vois que des promenades
|-
|21. Ah qu'il est doux de se rendre
|-
|22. J'ai fait serment, cruelle, de suivre une autre loi
|-
|23. Le printemps ramène la verdure
|-
|24. Depuis que l'on soupire sous l'amoureux empire
|-
|25. Sans mentir on est bien misérable
|-
|26. Venerabilis barba capucinorum
|-
|rowspan="26"|LWV 77
|1. Anima Christi
|-
|2. Ave coeli munus supernum
|-
|3. Dixit Dominus
|-
|4. Domine salvum fac regem
|-
|5. Exaudi Deus deprecationem
|-
|6. Iste Sanctus
|-
|7. Laudate pueri Dominum
|-
|8. Magnificat anima mea
|-
|9. O dulcissime Domine	
|-
|10. Omnes Gentes plaudite|-
|11. O sapientia in misterio|-
|12. Regina coeli|-
|13. Salve regina|-
|14. Domine salvum fac regem|-
|15. Exaudiat te Dominus|-
|16. Jubilate Deo|-
|17. Notus in Judea Deus|-
|18. Il faut mourir, pécheur|-
|19. Si je n'ay parlé de ma flamme|-
|20. En ces lieux je ne vois que des promenades|-
|21. Ah qu'il est doux de se rendre|-
|22. J'ai fait serment, cruelle, de suivre une autre loi|-
|23. Le printemps ramène la verdure|-
|24. Depuis que l'on soupire sous l'amoureux empire|-
|25. Sans mentir on est bien misérable|-
|26. Venerabilis barba capucinorum (air à boire)|-
|}

Works by genre

Operas (Tragédies en musique)Cadmus et Hermione (1673)Alceste (1674)Thésée (1675)Atys (1676)Isis (1677)Psyché (1678)Bellérophon (1679)Proserpine (1680)Persée (1682)Phaëton (1683)Amadis (1684)Roland (1685)Armide (1686)Achille et Polyxène (1687) (Finished by Pascal Collasse)

PastoralesPastorale Comique (1657)Les fêtes de l'Amour et de Bacchus (1672)Acis et Galatée (1686)

BalletsLa raillerie, or Mockery, (1659)La revente des habits du ballet et comédie (1661)L'impatience (1661)Les saisons (1661)Les arts (1663)Les noces de village (1663)Les amours desguisés (1664)Palais d'Alcine (1664)Le naissance de Vénus (1665)Les gardes (1665)Mascarade du capitaine (1665)Petit ballet de Fontainebleau (1665)Les muses (1666)Le carnaval (1668)Flore (1669)La jeunesse (1669)Les jeux pythiens (1670)Ballet des nations (1670) in Le Bourgeois gentilhomme written by MolièreLe triomphe de l'amour (1681)Le temple de la paix (1685)

Ballets written with othersMascarade de la foire de St-Germain (1652)Les proverbes (1654)Le temps (1654)Les plaisirs (1655)Les bienvenus (1655)Psyché ou la puissance de l'amour (1656)Les galanteries du temps (1657)Les plaisirs troublés (1657)Alcidiane (LWV 9, 1658, with Boësset)Le triomphe de Bacchus dans les Indes (1666)

Comedies (Comédies)L'Impromptu de Versailles (1663)Le Mariage forcé (1664)L'Amour médecin (1665)Le Sicilien (1667)Georges Dandin (1668)Monsieur de Pourceaugnac (1669)Les Amants Magnifiques (1670)La Comtesse d'Escarbagnas (1671)

Comédie-balletsLes Plaisirs de l'île enchantée (1664)La Princesse d'Elide (1664)Le Bourgeois Gentilhomme (1670)

Comedies cowritten with LullyLes fâcheux (1661)

Tragédie-balletsPsyché (1671)

DivertissementsLe Grand Divertissement de Versailles (1668) in Georges DandinLe Divertissement de Chambord (1669) in Monsieur de PourceaugnacLe Divertissement Royal (1670) in Les Amants MagnifiquesIdylle sur la Paix (1685)

Eclogues (Églogues)La grotte de Versailles (1668)

Interludes (Intermèdes)Les noces de Pélée et de Thétis (1654)Xerxes (1660)Hercule amoureux (1662)Oedipe (1664)

Grands motetsin order of composition:Jubilate Deo omnis terra (Psalm 100), LWV 77/16 (1660)Miserere mei Deus (Psalm 51), LWV 25 (1664)O lachrymae fideles, LWV 26 (1664)Plaude laetare Gallia, LWV 37 (1668)Te Deum, LWV 55 (1677)De profundis clamavi ad te (Psalm 130) in G Minor, LWV 62 (1683)Dies irae in G Minor, LWV 64/1 (1683)
Canticle: Benedictus Dominus Deus Israel, LWV 64/2 (1683)Quare fremuerunt (Psalm 2), LWV 67 (1684)Exaudiat te Dominus (Psalm 20), LWV 77/15 (1684)Notus in Judaea Deus (Psalm 76), LWV 77/17 (1685)

Petits motetsin alphabetical order:Anima Christi, LWV 77/1 (1684)Ave caeli munus supernum à 3, LWV 77/2 (1684)Dixit Dominus (Psalm 109), LWV 77/3Domine salvum fac regem, LWV 77/14 (1670)Exaudi Deus deprecationem, LWV 77/5Laudate pueri Dominum (Psalm 112), LWV 77/7 (1685)O dulcissime Domine, LWV 77/9 (1685)Omnes gentes plaudite, LWV 77/10O sapientia in misterio, LWV 77/11
Marian antiphon: Regina caeli laetare, LWV 77/12 (1684)
Marian antiphon: Salve regina, LWV 77/13 (1684)

Other worksAir de tendre et couranteDialogue de la guerre avec la paix (1655)Première marche des mousquetaires (1658)Courage, amour, la paix est faite (1661)Douce et charmante paix (1661)Ingrate bergère (1664)Qui les saura, mes secrètes amours (1664)Branles (1665)Trios pour le coucher du roi (1665)Belle inhumaine, soulagez la peine (1665)Savez-vous bien, la belle (1665)La langueur des beaux yeux (1666)Que vous connaissez peu trop aimable Climène (1666)Si je n'ai parlé de ma flamme  (1666)En ces lieux, je ne vois que des promenades (1668)Ah, qu'il est doux de se rendre à l'empire de l'Amour (1668)Le printemps ramène la verdure (1668)Depuis que l'on soupire sous l'amoureux empire (1668)Marches et batteries de tambour (1670)Sans mentir on est bien misérable (1671)Marche (1672)Marches pour le régiment de Savoie (1685)Pièces de symphonies, Airs pour Mme la Dauphine (1683)Airs pour le carrousel de Monseigneur (1686)Il faut mourir, pécheur  (1687)GigueMarches dont la marche des dragons du Roi, La marche du Prince d'OrangeMarche des mousquetaires noirsMarche des mousquetaires grisAunque prodigoasSoca per tuttiA la fin petit DesfargesD'un beau pêcheur, la pêche malheureuseUn tendre coeurNon vi è più bel piacerLe printemps, aimable SylvieTous les jours cent bergèresViens, mon aimable bergèreNous mêlons toute notre gloirePendant que ces flambeauxVenerabilis barba capucinorum Apocryphal composition(s) 
French sources widely attribute to Lully the composition of the British patriotic anthem God Save the Queen: the sole ultimate source of the attribution is a 19th-century forgery, the Souvenirs of the Marquise de Créquy (q.v.).

The music of the Provençal Christmas carol La Marche des Rois'' is sometimes attributed to Lully, but no document corroborates this attribution. (See article The March of the Kings.)

Lully, Jean-Baptiste